Gouleta is a genus of beetles in the family Carabidae, containing the following species:

 Gouleta cayennensis (Dejean, 1831)
 Gouleta gentryi Erwin, 1994
 Gouleta notiophiloides (Erwin, 1973)
 Gouleta spangleri (Erwin, 1973)

References

Trechinae